2-Hydroxy-1,4-benzoxazin-3-one monooxygenase (BX5 (gene), CYP71C3 (gene)) is an enzyme with systematic name 2-hydroxy-2H-1,4-benzoxazin-3(4H)-one,NAD(P)H:oxygen oxidoreductase (N-hydroxylating). This enzyme catalyses the following chemical reaction

 2-hydroxy-2H-1,4-benzoxazin-3(4H)-one + NAD(P)H + H+ + O2  2,4-dihydroxy-2H-1,4-benzoxazin-3(4H)-one + NAD(P)+ + H2O

2-Hydroxy-1,4-benzoxazin-3-one monooxygenase is involved in the biosynthesis of protective and allelopathic benzoxazinoids in some plants.

References

External links 
 

EC 1.14.13